Leipzig Slevogtstraße station is a railway station in Leipzig, capital city of Saxony, Germany, located near Slevogtstraße.

References

Slevogtstraße
Slevogtstraße